Judgment Night is a 1993 American  action crime thriller film directed by Stephen Hopkins and starring Emilio Estevez, Cuba Gooding Jr., Jeremy Piven and Stephen Dorff as a group of friends on the run from a gang of drug dealers (led by Denis Leary) after they witness a murder.

Plot
Frank Wyatt, his brother John and their friends, Mike Peterson and Ray Cochran meet up in their suburban neighborhood to take a road trip in Ray's luxurious RV to watch a professional boxing match in Chicago for the night.

With the freeway gridlocked, Ray exits the expressway and cuts through an extremely run-down and destitute residential neighborhood. The four friends are alarmed when they accidentally hit a man named Teddy.

A long argument ensues regarding contacting the police, which Ray, who had been driving the RV when it hit Teddy, does not want to happen due to the fact the friends had been drinking during their journey. Frank makes the decision to exit the RV to help the victim.

Inspecting Teddy, they find that he has been shot and has a paper bag filled with money. The injured young man is brought into the RV so the friends can get him to a hospital.

The RV is sideswiped by a car, leaving it lodged in a narrow alleyway. Three dangerous men — Sykes, Rhodes and Travis — force their way into the window at the back of the RV and drag Teddy outside. Fallon, a local crime lord, arrives and executes Teddy for stealing the money, the execution witnessed by Frank and his brother and friends. Fallon then sets his sights to kill the four witnesses.

The friends are chased by Fallon's men into a rail yard. They hide in an old streetcar in which several homeless people are sheltering. They blackmail the four men into handing over their valuables but are heard by the pursuing gang members. The four friends and homeless people from multiple train cars flee. Fallon shoots and kills one of the homeless people, mistaking them for his quarry.

Taking refuge in an apartment building, the four friends convince a resident to call the police but Fallon and his men arrive at the complex, going door to door terrorizing the occupants to hand over the four friends if they were inside.

The resident demands the four friends to leave immediately as their presence in her home is putting her and her baby as well as her roommates lives in grave danger. The roommate takes some pity and tells the four friends that there is an escape route to another building via the roof.

The friends use a ladder to cross over an alley onto the other rooftop but are pursued by Fallon and his men. Ray stays behind and tries to bribe the drug gang into letting them go. Fallon, disgusted by Ray's tactics and privileged upbringing, throws Ray from the roof, killing him.
 
The trio are chased into the sewers by Fallon and his henchmen. Mike shoots and kills Sykes, allowing them to escape. Discovering Sykes' body, a comment made by Travis annoys Fallon and he drowns Travis.

The trio then break into a swap meet, hoping to summon the police by setting off the building's alarm and are arrested by two security guards. Fallon and Rhodes arrive and kill the guards as the trio hide in the store. Rhodes and Mike engage in a shootout that kills Rhodes but leaves Mike wounded. John retrieves Mike, but Fallon shoots John in the leg. The three friends make their way to a bathroom where Frank tends to their wounds. Frank leaves to try to get help but spots Fallon, who is about to discover John and Mike.

Frank shouts out, causing Fallon to search for him. A fight ensues where Frank ultimately overpowers Fallon and throws him off a ledge to his death.

Police and paramedics arrive, taking Mike and John to a hospital where they are expected to survive their wounds. Frank then exits the building to his waiting wife.

Cast
 Emilio Estevez as Frank Wyatt, a family man going with his brother and his two friends to the boxing match
 Cuba Gooding Jr. as Mike Peterson, Frank's best friend who goes to the boxing match
 Denis Leary as Fallon, the drug lord who pursues the four friends after they see him kill a thieving henchman
 Stephen Dorff as John Wyatt, Frank's younger brother, who is invited by Frank to the boxing match after Frank's third friend drops out.
 Jeremy Piven as Ray Cochran, A friend who rents an RV to take his friends to a boxing match
 Peter Greene as Sykes, Fallon's second-in-command
 Everlast (credited as Erik Schrody) as Rhodes, one of Fallon's minions
 Michael Wiseman as Travis, one of Fallon's minions
 Michael DeLorenzo as Teddy, Fallon's lieutenant who is executed for stealing from him, right in front of Frank, Mike, John, and Ray, thus beginning the chase
 Christine Harnos as Linda Wyatt, Frank's wife and John's sister-in-law, she reluctantly agrees to let Frank go to the boxing match

Production
Screenwriter Kevin Jarre had written the first spec script for the movie (Under its original title, "Escape") sometime around 1989 or earlier, which was based on a story idea by Richard DiLello, and producer Lawrence Gordon, who produced films like Predator (1987) and Die Hard (1988), bought it in January 1990. At the 25th anniversary screening of the film during Cinepocalypse film festival in Chicago, director Stephen Hopkins confirmed in a Q&A about how Jarre's script, which was a lot darker and more violent, went through different writers, including John Carpenter, William Wisher, Randall Wallace, and Christopher Crowe, and many different versions, which involved bikers in the desert outside L.A., and rooftop motorcycle chases. The original script was entirely re-written to the point where only Lewis Colick, one of the writers who worked on re-writes, got the final screenplay credit (Colick shares story credit with novelist Jere Cunningham).

According to Hopkins, he wanted John Travolta in the lead role and Kevin Spacey in the main villain role; other actors, including Ray Liotta, Tom Cruise, Samuel L. Jackson, and Christian Slater, were either offered or had turned down roles in the film.

Comedian Adam Carolla was a stand-in for one of the "bad guy" actors, Michael Wiseman. He was friends with the assistant director. It was his first foray into film.

Reception

Box office
The movie debuted at No. 5. The film grossed a total of $12,136,938 at the US Box Office.

Critical response
On Rotten Tomatoes, the film has an approval rating of 35% based on 20 reviews, with an average rating of 4.2/10. On Metacritic it has a score of 46% based on reviews from 11 critics, indicating "mixed or average reviews". Audiences polled by CinemaScore gave the film an average grade of "B" on an A+ to F scale.

Leonard Klady of Variety wrote: "The most chilling aspect of the urban thriller "Judgment Night" is how infinitely superior its craft is to its art. This is an exceedingly well directed, cleverly filmed and edited, tension-filled affair. It is also a wholly preposterous, muddled, paranoid's view of the inner-city nightmare where the slightest misstep is sure to have a fateful result." Richard Harrington of The Washington Post felt the movie was "regrettably familiar fare" and stated "The filmmakers have made a big deal of a soundtrack that features 11 collaborations between rappers and rockers (...), but their casting consciousness is less adventurous."

Soundtrack and score
A soundtrack for the film titled Judgment Night: Music From The Motion Picture (featuring rock and rap musicians collaborating) was released the same year on September 14, 1993. The score for the film, composed and conducted by Alan Silvestri, is completely orchestral. Silvestri previously collaborated with Hopkins in Predator 2.

In 2005, Intrada released a complete version of Silvestri's orchestral score, containing two rejected tracks that he composed with electronic synthesized elements.

Score album track listing
All tracks composed and conducted by Alan Silvestri

opening montage song  “Fallin'”
Song by De La Soul and Teenage Fanclub

 "Freeway Confrontation"	– 2:07 - Played when the group engages in a fight on the highway.
 "New Passenger"		– 4:33
 "Execution"			– 5:22 - Played when the group witnessed a murder and escapes the RV.
 "Train Yard"			– 2:13 - Played while the group was hiding in a train cab.
 "Some 'Splainin' to Do"	– 5:17
 "Bat Woman"			– 2:14 - Played when Frank saw a woman throwing trash.
 "Ladder Crossing"		– 9:45 - Played when the group crosses the bridge ladder.
 "Ray's Deal"			– 3:24 - Heard when Ray made a deal with the goons.
 "Ray Eats It"			– 2:05 - Played when Ray fell off of the building.
 "Hello Ladies"		– 1:30 - Played when the goons find them in the sewers.
 "Make a Stand"		– 3:32 - Played when Mike and the group decide to make a stand against the goons.
 "Mike Shoots Sykes"		– 5:20
 "All I Got Is You"		– 4:40
 "Stalk & Talk"		– 4:41
 "Final Fight"			– 3:34
 "It's Over"			– 1:04
 "Frank Takes the Wheel"  	– 4:02	(Unused) - Should be played when the group is chasing the police vehicle.
 "I Tried" 			– 2:36	(Unused) - Should be heard when John is sobbing and makes a confession to his brother Frank.
 "Judgment Night Theme"	– 3:09

References

External links
 
 
 
 

1993 films
1993 action thriller films
1990s psychological thriller films
Films set in Chicago
1990s English-language films
American action thriller films
American neo-noir films
American chase films
American survival films
Hood films
Films directed by Stephen Hopkins
Largo Entertainment films
Films scored by Alan Silvestri
1990s American films